In baseball statistics, a putout (denoted by PO or fly out when appropriate) is given to a defensive player who records an out by tagging a runner with the ball when he is not touching a base (a tagout), catching a batted or thrown ball and tagging a base to put out a batter or runner (a force out), catching a thrown ball and tagging a base to record an out on an appeal play, catching a third strike (a strikeout), catching a batted ball on the fly (a fly out), or being positioned closest to a runner called out for interference. First base, or 1B, is the first of four stations on a baseball diamond which must be touched in succession by a baserunner to score a run for that player's team. A first baseman is the player on the team playing defense who fields the area nearest first base, and is responsible for the majority of plays made at that base. In the numbering system used to record defensive plays, the first baseman is assigned the number 3.

The great majority of putouts recorded by first basemen result from their fielding a throw from one of the other three infielders or the pitcher on a ground out. Because of the frequency of ground outs, first basemen typically accumulate higher putout totals than players at any other position, and they often benefit in this area from the defensive skill of the other infielders. Other ways in which first basemen often record a putout include catching a pop-up or line drive, fielding a ground ball close enough to first base that they can step on the bag before the batter/runner arrives, tagging a runner on a pickoff play, receiving a throw to retire a runner who fails to tag up on a fly ball out, receiving a throw to retire a batter/runner on a bunt (often a sacrifice hit), and tagging a runner stranded between bases in a rundown play. Occasionally, a first baseman can record two putouts on a single play; with a runner taking a lead off first base and less than two out, the first baseman can catch a line drive near the base, then step on the bag before the runner can return, completing a double play. On two occasions in major league history, a first baseman has recorded three putouts on a single play for an unassisted triple play: On September 14, 1923, George Burns of the Boston Red Sox accomplished the feat in the second inning against the Cleveland Indians by catching a line drive, tagging the runner off first base, then sprinting to step on second base before the runner off that base could return. And on May 31, 1927, Johnny Neun of the Detroit Tigers completed a triple play in the same way, also against the Indians, securing a 1-0 victory in the ninth inning.

As strikeout totals have risen in baseball, the frequency of other defensive outs including ground outs has declined; as a result, putout totals for first basemen have likewise declined, and ten of the top eleven career leaders ended their careers before 1961. Through 2021, only two of the top 31 single-season totals have been recorded since 1927, and only 27 of the top 125 since 1945. Jake Beckley is the all-time leader in career putouts as a first baseman with 23,755. Cap Anson (21,699), Ed Konetchy (21,361), Eddie Murray (21,255), and Charlie Grimm (20,711) are the only other players to record 20,000 career putouts.

Key

List

Stats updated as of the end of the 2022 season.

Other Hall of Famers

Notes

References

External links

Major League Baseball statistics
Putouts as a first baseman